r/art is an internet forum on Reddit dedicated to art discussions and the sharing of artwork. As of January 2023, it has over 22 million members. It is the largest art-related forum on Reddit.

History 
r/art was created in 2008. In 2014, it was made a default subreddit, which meant that all Reddit users were subscribed to the forum by default.

In 2015, the moderators of the subreddit shut the forum down in protest of the firing of Victoria Taylor, then an employee at Reddit.

Academic analysis 

A study in 2022 found that approximately 10.15% of discussion on r/art were "toxic comments", using a sample of 1,021,702 comments. A separate study found that controversial comments on the subreddit had more anger, less admiration, and less joy compared to non-controversial comments, and that these emotional differences were larger than those in political subreddits.

In 2015, the online art magazine Hyperallergic described r/art as comprising "mostly artwork uploaded by artists of all skill levels requesting feedback, with few discussions, questions, and articles scattered in between these personal submissions".

2022 AI art controversy 
In late 2022, the moderators of r/art removed the artwork of Ben Moran, a Vietnam-based artist, and banned them from the subreddit, citing the artwork's resemblance to AI-generated art, which is unallowed on the forum. When Moran contacted the moderators to "complain" about the ban, the moderators stated:
 I don't believe you. Even if you did "paint" it yourself, it's so obviously an AI-prompted design that it doesn't matter.
 If you really are a "serious" artist, then you need to find a different style, because A) no one is going to believe when you say it's not AI, and B) the AI can do better in seconds what might take you hours. 
 Sorry, it's the way of the world.
Moran was then muted from messaging the subreddit moderators. As of January 7, 2023, they remain banned from the forum. The subreddit moderators have stated that to "reverse course now... [would mean that] online trolls get to dictate the state of the community."

References

Internet forums
Subreddits